James "Seán Óg" Hanley (1877 – August 1915) was an Irish hurler who played as a full-back for the Limerick and London Irish senior teams.

Hanley made his first appearance on the inter-county scene for the Limerick team during the 1896 championship and later played with London Irish until the end of the 1903 championship. During that time he won one All-Ireland medal and one Munster medal.

At club level Hanley was a one-time county club championship medalist with Kilfinane. He also lined out with the Robert Emmett's club in London.

References

1877 births
1915 deaths
Kilfinane hurlers
Robert Emmett's (London) hurlers
Limerick inter-county hurlers
London inter-county hurlers
All-Ireland Senior Hurling Championship winners